Glurns is a comune (municipality) in South Tyrol in northern Italy, located about  northwest of Bolzano.

Geography

Glurns borders the following municipalities: Mals, Prad am Stilfser Joch, Schluderns and Taufers im Münstertal.

History

Coat-of-arms
The shield is party per pale: the first part represents half Tyrolean Eagle on argent; the second is tierced per fess of sable, argent and gules. The eagle represents the membership of the village to the Tyrol, while the colors sable, argent and gules are those of the city. The emblem was granted in 1528 by Ferdinand I, Holy Roman Emperor.

Society

Linguistic distribution
According to the 2011 census, 96.13% of the population speak German and 3.87% Italian as first language.

Demographic evolution

References

External links
 Homepage of the municipality

Municipalities of South Tyrol